Comet Queen is a superhero appearing in media published by DC Comics, primarily as a member of the Legion of Super-Heroes in the 30th and 31st centuries prior to Zero Hour.

Fictional character biography

Pre-Zero Hour
Grava of the Earth colony Extal is a long-time fan of Star Boy, and wants desperately to become a member of the Legion.  Hoping to gain superpowers she foolishly jumps from a space ship onto the tail of a passing comet. She fails to realize that Star Boy has flown through a particular comet while inside a starship, rather than unprotected by anything more than a futuristic space-suit. The ploy works and the comet gives her the ability to fly in the vacuum of space as well as the ability to emit various "comet-like gases".

The comet tail alters Grava's physical form, giving her hair the appearance of streaming flames. Presented as nominally humanoid in flashback, her father appears to be some species derived from something akin to rats, and this suggests she is of mixed parentage or possibly adopted.

In Tales of the Legion of Super-Heroes #336 (June 1986), Reserve Legionnaire Bouncing Boy describes to his comrade Superboy how he came to meet the young heroine while he was on a goodwill tour to a planet called Quaal III. Comet Queen ambushed him in the hotel and introduced herself, declaring him her very own "personal Legionnaire". Bouncing Boy rejected Comet Queen's initial bid for membership on the grounds that she has not proven herself. Later, he finds out from several hotel guests, including Grava's own father, that the girl has gone off in a fit of dejection to search for Quaal III's lava seas to seek out the planet's mythical natives as a "super-feat" to prove herself worthy. This mirrors Supergirl's bid to join the Legion by excavating various Earthling artifacts. Instead, Bouncing Boy and Comet Queen end up in a near-death situation until they work together to escape.

As a result of Comet Queen's adventure with Bouncing Boy, she is accepted into the Legion Academy training program, located at Montauk Point (a safe distance from the Legion itself) and is taught by Bouncing Boy and his wife Duo Damsel. It is here that she becomes friends with other Legion hopefuls, including Superman's supposed descendant Laurel Kent, and Shadow Lass's cousin, Shadow Kid.

Comet Queen's unusual appearance is paired with eccentric speech patterns – her dialogue is peppered with bizarre private slang that incorporates words related to celestial bodies, seemingly at random. Her dialogue is usually presented in square, yellow-tinged speech balloons with thick lines, and her idiosyncratic rhythms baffle those around her, often as a spoof of stereotypical Valley Girl style.

She is later recruited into a short-lived version of the Legion of Substitute Heroes, formed by Cosmic Boy to deal with special missions. Other members of this group include Night Girl, Karate Kid, as well as her former teachers, Bouncing Boy and Duo Damsel.

Post-Zero Hour
Comet Queen makes two appearances after Zero Hour: Crisis in Time, in Legionnaires #43 (December 1996), and later as a member of the new Legion Academy in Legion #25.

Post-Infinite Crisis/52 
Comet Queen later appears in Final Crisis: Legion of 3 Worlds #5, among many Legionnaires from alternate realities and Legion-related characters who have been brought to fight the Time Trapper.

Comet Queen made another appearance in Legion of Super-Heroes (vol. 7) #6, as part of the active class at the Legion Academy. Later in that series many Legionaries are considered lost and presumed dead. The legion is shorthanded and she and several members of the academy are inducted into it. After a couple of issues she betrays the Legion to their enemies the Dominators. The book was canceled before the story line was resolved.

Powers and abilities
After exposure to a comet's tail, Comet Queen gained the ability to fly, even in the vacuum of space. She can also emit a variety of noxious gases that can be used to stun an opponent.

References

External links
Comet Queen at the Unofficial Guide to the DC Universe

Characters created by Keith Giffen
Comics characters introduced in 1983
DC Comics aliens
DC Comics extraterrestrial superheroes
DC Comics female superheroes